There have been many monarchs adopting the name "Henry". Years shown below are the regnal years.

Byzantine Empire
 Henry of Flanders (1205–1216) (Latin Empire)

China
Puyi, Last emperor of the Qing dynasty.

England, Wales and Ireland
 Henry I of England r. (1100–1135)
 Henry II of England r. (1154–1189)
 Henry the Young King, junior king to Henry II, r. (1170–1183)
 Henry III of England r. (1216–1272)
 Henry IV of England r. (1399–1413)
 Henry V of England r. (1413–1422)
 Henry VI of England r. (1422–1461, 1470–1471)
 Henry VII of England r. (1485–1509)
 Henry VIII of England r. (1509–1547)
 Henry Benedict Stuart, recognised by Jacobites as King Henry IX .

Scotland
Note there was no king of Scotland named Henry, although there was a king consort:
 Henry Stuart, Lord Darnley

France
 Henry I of France (1031–1060)
 Henry II of France (1547–1559)
 Henry III of France (1574–1589)
 Henry IV of France (1589–1610)
 Henry V of France (1830)

Germany and Holy Roman Empire
This refers to a much disputed line of kings that have in one way or another dominated Germany since the time of Charlemagne.

Holy Roman Emperors
 Henry II (1002–1024)
 Henry III (1039–1056)
 Henry IV (1056–1106)
 Henry V (1106–1125)
 Henry VI (1190–1197)
 Henry VII (1308–1314)

Dukes of Saxony
 Henry I the Fowler (912–936)
 Henry II the Proud (1137–1139)
 Henry III the Lion (1142–1180)

Dukes of Bavaria
 Henry I 947–955
 Henry II the Quarrelsome 955–976, 985–995
 Henry III the Younger 983–985
 Henry IV the Saint (=Emperor Henry II) 995–1005
 Henry V 1005–1026
 Henry VI the Black (=Emperor Henry III) 1026–1041
 Henry VII 1042–1047
 Henry VIII (=Emperor Henry IV) 1053–1054, 1055–1061
 Henry IX the Black 1120–1126
 Henry X the Proud 1126–1139 (also Duke of Saxony)
 Henry XI Jasomirgott 1141–1156 (also Margrave, then Duke of Austria)
 Henry XII the Lion 1156–1180 (also Duke of Saxony)
 Henry XIII 1253–1290
 Henry XIV the Older 1309–1339
 Henry XV the Natterberger 1312–1333
 Henry XVI the Rich 1393–1450
 Henry XVII of Bavaria 1483–1512

Margraves and Dukes of Austria
 Margrave Henry I (994–1018)
 Margrave Henry II Jasomirgott (1141–1177) (Margrave of Austria and Duke of Bavaria, 1143–1156, Duke of Austria from 1156)

Pannonia and Dalmatia
 King Henry (1182–1204)

Portugal
 Henry, Count of Portugal (1096–1112)
 Henry I the Chaste (1578–1580)

Spain

Castille 

 Henry I (1214–1217)
 Henry II the Fracticidal (1366–1367; 1369–1379)
 Henry III the Suffering (1390–1406)
 Henry IV the Impotent (1454–1474)

Navarre
 Henry I the Fat r. (1270–1274), aka Henry III of Champagne
 Henry II r. (1516–1555)
 Henry III r. (1572–1589), aka Henry IV of France

Henry
Henry